Ibokun (also IIemure, Ilu Obokun, Ilu'bokun) is a town in Osun State, Nigeria. It is 416 meters above sea level. Ibokun is the headquarters of Obokun. The postal code of the area is 233.

History
Ibokun (at that time Ilemure) was named after the warrior that saved the town from attacks of nearby warriors such as Alare- the ruler of Ilare. It was believed that Obokun migrated from Ifẹ as the youngest son of Oduduwa. He volunteered to fetch sea water to cure his father's blindness which translated to Obokun in Yoruba language. That means someone who fetches sea water. On his return he was told his father was dead, and he asked for his portion of his inheritances. He was told that all inheritances were given to his elder brothers. Instead he was given a sword–Ida Ajase (sword of conquest) and told to get his heritage from his elder brothers. On his conquest tours, he got to Ilemure now Ibokun where he met Ita on ground during one of the festive periods, Obokun was welcomed and he requested the host should extend the celebration with drums and dancing which was against the rules of the land- Ibokun by the neighbor "super master". The host danced to the tunes of Obokun's instruction which led to several wars Obokun conquered. Ita Adeforitikun (the host) later appealed to Obokun to stay in the town (Ilemure) and gave him a place to build his own house.

Ajibogun (Obokun) accepted the offer and Ita gave him one of the three traditional crowns he brought from Ile-Ife because Obokun did not meet anything at his arrival from the seas. Ita gave his first son Agaba-Ogo one of the two remaining crowns and sent him to Mesi-Oloja (now Imesi-ile) to become their ruler and the third crown he gave to his second son who succeeded him as the ruler of Ilemure, Ooyelagbo (abbreviated as Ooyela).

The town was changed to Ibokun after the demise of Ita by people who were referring to the town as 'Ilu Eni to bu Okun' meaning the town of the 'brine fetcher'. The town name was changed from Ilu Obokun to Ilu'bokun and eventually to Ibokun. It is of note that the only direct son of Obokun was the man called Olabusuke Obarabara Olokun-Esin who was exiled from Ibokun by Obokun because he did not trust the people. Olabusuke later became Owa of Ilesa (king of Ilesa) and by extension of the whole Ijesaland. The person appointed by Obokun when he became old was Adelowo Ajangbodorigi-Efon to act as surrogate ruler for him and his descendant overs the territory given to him by Ita. The descendants and successors of Adelowo later transmuted to Ogboni of Ibokun or 'Ba'bokun.< Reliable Oral History and The History of Yorubas by Reverend Johnson >

Economy and occupation
The people of Ibokun were farmers who specialised in growing food crops such as yam, cassava, maize, rice, cash crops such as cocoa, kola nut, etc. However, the thrust of commerce is central to their activities and they participate in trading mostly in the western and the northern part of Nigeria.

Ibokun monarchs

 Joseph Morounfola Dada (J.M.D)  Anifalaje and Elerinla II of Ibokun Land (1961 - March 28, 1968)
 John Olajide Oyekanmi and Adanlawo IV (1970 -2010) were the first Ogboni ('Ba'bokun) of Ibokun to wear a crown.
 Festus Kayode Awogboro and Ose V are the current monarch.

References

Populated places in Osun State
Towns in Yorubaland